Centennial High School is a secondary school in Ellicott City, Maryland, United States, that opened in 1977. The school is based in Howard County and is part of the Howard County Public Schools system. The school is named after its road frontage on Centennial Lane, built in 1876 as a shortcut through Denton Hammond's slave plantation Burleigh Manor between Clarksville and Ellicott City.

In 1984–85, the school was recognized as one of the top 100 high schools in the country through the USDE Secondary School Recognition Program. In 1996, Centennial High School was the first high school within Maryland to achieve the excellence standard in all categories of the Maryland State Performance Assessment Program's (MSPAP) report card. The school maintained these standards throughout 2000 and 2001. In 2008, the school was nominated by U.S. News & World Report as a "silver medal" school, placing in the top 505 high schools nationwide. In a 2012 joint study by Newsweek and The Daily Beast, Centennial was ranked the second-best public high school in Maryland and number 111 in the nation. In 2014, Centennial was ranked as the best public school in Maryland and 18th in the U.S. In 2017 the school was awarded "gold medal" by US News & World Report which ranked it as the 373rd best school nationwide and 11th in the State of Maryland.

In 2015, the Centennial men's basketball team bested Westlake for the Maryland 3A state title.

The school has a maximum capacity of 1,360 students, but through the addition of nine portable classrooms currently (as of 2022) enrolls over 1,614 students. Of those in attendance, 41.7% are Asian, 38.6% are White, 8.9% are African American, 5.6% are Hispanic, 0.3% are Native American, 0.2% are Hawaiian or Pacific Islander, and 5.1% are two or more races.

Notable alumni
 Suzanne Malveaux – CNN anchor
 Andrew Marshall – professional soccer player
 Jan W. Rivkin – economist, Harvard Business School professor
 Aaron Russell – Olympic volleyball player
 Ken Ulman – Former Howard County Executive

References and notes

External links

Centennial High School website
Centennial High School Sporting Records
Centennial High School Facebook

Public schools in Howard County, Maryland
Public high schools in Maryland
Educational institutions established in 1977
Buildings and structures in Ellicott City, Maryland
1977 establishments in Maryland